Pachytriton changi is a species of salamander in the family Salamandridae from Guangdong, China.

References

changi